Vanspor FK, formerly Van Büyükşehir Belediyespor, is a Turkish professional football club based in Van, a city in eastern Turkey.

History
Van is now represented by Van Büyükşehir Belediyespor (founded in 1982), which gained promotion to the 3rd League (Fourth Level) for the 2006–07 season. Van Belediyespor changed their name to Belediye Vanspor and their colours from blue-white to black-red. This color combination was that of Vanspor's old colours. They promoted to 2nd League by finishing 1st in 1st Group of Third League in 2007–2008 season.

Previous names
Belediye Vanspor (1982–2014)
Van Büyükşehir Belediyespor (2014–2019)
Vanspor Futbol Kulübü (2019–present)

League history

TFF Second League: 2008–11, 2019–
TFF Third League: 2006–08, 2011–19
Amatör Futbol Ligleri: 1982–2006

Current squad

Other players under contract

References

External links
Official website
Twitter
Fan Site
Vanspor on TFF.org
Vanspor Haber / News

Football clubs in Turkey
Association football clubs established in 1982
1982 establishments in Turkey
Van, Turkey